Asllan Rusi Sports Palace is an indoor sporting arena located in Tirana, Albania with a seating capacity of 4,000 people. The arena is named after the volleyball player Asllan Rusi.

Gallery

See also
 List of indoor arenas in Albania

References

Indoor arenas in Albania
Buildings and structures in Tirana
Basketball venues in Albania
Sports venues in Albania
Indoor track and field venues